Pikesville High School (PHS) is a four-year public high school in Baltimore County, Maryland, United States. It is part of the Baltimore County Public Schools consolidated school district. The school was opened in 1964 as Pikesville Senior High School with grades 9-11 and was renamed in the mid-1980s as part of a county-wide grade realignment. The classes currently span on 80 minute periods with an A and B day schedule. The school has recently received a $40 million renovation, including a math wing and science wing that replaced a single hallway of rooms and adjacent courtyard. The other courtyard was filled with more learning spaces. The cafeteria was expanded along with asbestos removal.

The school is located in the community of Pikesville, just inside Baltimore County to the northwest of Baltimore City. It is located on the corner of Smith Avenue and Labyrinth Road.  The school's district borders Towson High School, Dulaney High School, Owings Mills High School, New Town High School, Randallstown High School, Milford Mill High School, and Woodlawn High School.

In 2005, Pikesville High was named as one of the top 100 America's best high schools.

Academics
Pikesville High school received a 59.4 out of a possible 90 points (65%) on the 2018-2019 Maryland State Department of Education Report Card and received a 4 out of 5 star rating, ranking in the 63rd percentile among all Maryland schools.

Students
The 2019–2020 enrollment at Pikesville High School was 922 students.

The graduation rate at Pikesville is fairly high, having been steady at 89–95% between 1996 and 2007.
The current graduation rate of Pikesville High is over 95%. Pikesville has a large enrollment of minority students. The racial makeup of the student body is 45.6% African American, 39.0% White, 8.1% Asian, 5.4% Hispanic, and 2.1% two or more races.

Athletics

State Championships
Golf
1A/2A 2000, 2001
Boys Soccer
1A 2016
Girls Basketball
1A 2019
Girls Indoor Track
1A 2014
Boys Indoor Track
1A 2013
Baseball
Class B 1986
Boys Lacrosse
2A-1A 2001, 2004, 2009
Ron Belinko Sportsmanship Award 2002
Softball
Eugene Robertson Sportsmanship Award 2017
Boys Track and Field
1A 2014

Extracurricular activities
Clubs and teams at the school include Spanish club, Jewish Culture Club, Christian Club, Interact, Key Club, Young Democrats and Republicans, National Honor Society, and Science Club. Many of the teams include Model UN, Model OAS, It's Academic, Mock Trial, and Model Congress.

Notable alumni
 Miša Aleksić - bass guitarist for Riblja Čorba
 Mark Elliott Brecher - Retired Chief Medical Officer LabCorp, Emeritus Professor University of North Carolina 
 Elise Burgin - professional tennis player
 Gary Gensler - named CFO of Hillary Clinton's presidential campaign 2015. Served in the United States Department of the Treasury as Assistant Secretary for Financial Institutions from 1997 to 1999
 Karen Hesse - author
 Shelly L. Hettleman - member of the Maryland Senate
 Hellin Kay - filmmaker and photographer
 Jeffrey Kluger - author of Lost Moon: the Perilous Voyage of Apollo 13, the basis of the movie Apollo 13
 Daniel Lipman - Emmy Award-winning television writer of An Early Frost and Queer as Folk
 Ken Mehlman - former chairman of the Republican National Committee (2005 to 2007)
 Jeff Pinkner - television writer and producer known for his work on Alias and Lost
 Marc E. Platt - producer of Legally Blonde.
 Mike Sager - best-selling author
 Jesse Schwartzman - professional lacrosse player
 Wendy Sherman - former chief nuclear negotiator for the U.S. State Department 
 Bert Vogelstein - oncologist at The Johns Hopkins Medical School and Sidney Kimmel Comprehensive Cancer Center
 Ellis Weiner - author 
 Bobby Zirkin - Former Maryland State Senator

Fictional Alumni
 John Munch - detective on Homicide: Life on the Street and Law & Order: Special Victims Unit

See also
 List of Schools in Baltimore County, Maryland

References and notes

External links

 

Educational institutions established in 1964
Public high schools in Maryland
Baltimore County Public Schools
Middle States Commission on Secondary Schools
Buildings and structures in Pikesville, Maryland
1964 establishments in Maryland